Michael Hayden (July 28, 1963) is an actor who has appeared both on the stage and on television.

Biography
Hayden graduated from the Juilliard School.
Stage
Hayden appeared in several productions at the Roundabout Theatre Company, New York, including The Matchmaker (1991) and All My Sons (1997). At the Lincoln Center Theater he appeared in Far East (1999) and the musical Dessa Rose (2005).

Hayden made his Broadway debut in the role of "Billy" in the 1994 Broadway revival of Carousel, for which he won the Theatre World Award and was nominated for the Drama Desk Award, Outstanding Actor in a Musical. He also played the role in the Royal National Theatre production in London in 1993, receiving an Olivier Award nomination for Best Actor in a Musical.

For his work in the 2001 Broadway revival of Judgment at Nuremberg he received the Tony Award nomination as Best Featured Actor in a Play. He played "Prince Hal" in Henry IV opposite Kevin Kline in 2003.  He appeared in the play Festen on Broadway in 2006.

In 2010 he played the roles of both "Henry V" and "Richard II" at the Shakespeare Theatre Company, Washington, DC.<ref>Marks, Peter."Michael Hayden as Richard II & Henry V: For the Bard, at last, a great American"The Washington Post, March 17, 2010</ref> For this work he received the company's Emery Battis Award.  Hayden has appeared at the Shakespeare Theatre Company in many works over the years.

Television
Hayden has appeared on the television series Law & Order, Law & Order: Criminal Intent and Law & Order: Special Victims Unit, as well as Hack.  He was a series regular on the ABC series Murder One.

Film
Hayden starred in the title role of William R. Pace's 1999 film Charming Billy as Jeremiah William Starkman, a commingling of Charles Whitman and Charles Starkweather who shoots random people off a rural water tower and reflects on the incidents in his life that led up to it.  Hayden's portrayal won the Best Actor award at the AFI/LA Film Festival.

Work (selected)The Dog in the Manger - Shakespeare Theatre Company, 2009'Tis Pity She's a Whore - American Conservatory Theater (San Francisco), 2008Festen - Broadway, 2006Henry IV - Broadway, 2003Enchanted April - Broadway, 2003Merrily We Roll Along - Kennedy Center, 2002
Judgment at Nuremberg - Broadway, 2001
Coriolanus - Shakespeare Theatre Company, 2000
Camino Real - Shakespeare Theatre Company, 2000
Cabaret - Broadway (replacement), 1999, and West End, 2006
Sweet Bird of Youth - Shakespeare Theatre Company, 1998
Carousel - Broadway, 1994

References

External links

Internet Movie Database listing
Biography at filmreference

1963 births
American male stage actors
Living people
Place of birth missing (living people)